Jacques Muller may refer to:

 Jacques Muller (politician) (born 1954), member of the Senate of France
 Jacques Muller (animator) (1956–2018), French animator
 Jacques Léonard Muller (1749–1824), army commander during the French Revolutionary Wars